Nimreh (also called Namara) is a village in southern Syria, administratively part of the al-Suwayda Governorate, located northeast of al-Suwayda. It is situated on the northern end of Jabal al-Arab. Nearby localities include Shaqqa, Hit and al-Junayneh to the north, Shahba, Salim and Mardak to the west and Mafaalah and Qanawat to the southwest. According to the Syria Central Bureau of Statistics (CBS), Nimreh had a population of 4,376 in the 2004 census.

History
In 1838 Eli Smith noted Nimreh as being located in Jebel Hauran, and inhabited by Druze and "Greek" Christians.

References

Bibliography

External links
 Map of town, Google Maps

Populated places in Shahba District
Druze communities in Syria